is Kokia's 9th single, released on May 21, 2003. It is Kokia's second most commercially successful single after "The Power of Smile/Remember the Kiss," due to being used as the daytime TV drama Itoshiki Mono e's theme song.

Background

This single was the Kokia's first to be released under Victor Entertainment management, after being managed under Gai Records for her second album Trip Trip and Pony Canyon for her debut Songbird. Previous to this single, Kokia had found severely limited chart success. Despite releasing two albums and 8 singles, only one of these had charted at all, "Aishiteiru Kara" at #99.

Promotion

Other than "Kawaranai Koto (Since 1976)" being featured in Itoshiki Mono e, the single was promoted in a variety of ways. The B-side "Tell Tell Bōzu" was used as the second ending theme song to the anime Hungry Heart: Wild Striker. Kokia was featured in many music-related and fashion-related magazines in May 2003, such as "Barfout," "Caz," "CD Hits," "Gekkan Piano," "Girl Pop," "Grand Magasin," "What's In?" and "Zappy."

Composition

"Kawaranai Koto (Since 1976)" is a mid-tempo pop song, featuring a sparse piano, percussion and occasional strings arrangement. The two choruses, however, feature a band arrangement with added guitars and percussion. The lyrics express somebody thanking a person they have been watching over and protecting for making them realise how much they loved them, despite being unable to express this to them. The lyrics ask the person's beloved to "instead of say thank you, look at me."

Music video

The music video was directed by Jun Hara (原淳). The majority of the clip is made up of double exposed shots spliced together. In these shots, there three main sequences: one featuring Kokia and a man dressed in black in a brown field, one featuring Kokia in a tall room with flowing curtains in which she sings the song, and one in which a child holds a red ball in an alleyway, as Kokia stands near to him. Other scenes the child, as well as of the house with tall, flowing curtains are shown. One distinctive shot in the piece is in the brown field, where a small green plant with red flowers is shown near the beginning and ending of the clip. At the beginning, there is only one flower, however at the end there are two.

Reception

The song debuted at #49 in its first week, selling 4,000 copies. A long selling single, it charted in the low top 50 for four weeks, peaking at #47. After seven weeks in the top 100 and an additional four between 100 and 200, the single managed to sell a total of 26,000 copies.

Track listing

Japan Sales Rankings

References

External links
Victor Kawaranai Koto (Since 1976) profile 
Motherld Kawaranai Koto (Since 1976) mini-site 

Kokia (singer) songs
2003 singles
Japanese-language songs
Songs written by Kokia (singer)